"Ivan Matveyich" is an 1886 short story by Anton Chekhov.

Publications
"Ivan Matveyich" was first published in Peterburgskaya Gazetas No. 60 (3 March), 1886 issue, signed A. Chekhonte (А. Чехонте)

In an edited version it was included into the Motley Stories (Пёстрые рассказы). On 24 March 1899 Pyotr Pertsov, having learnt of the forthcoming Marks publication, suggested that Chekhov should include into the Collected Works some stories from the Motley Stories first edition. Among them was "Ivan Matveyich", which Pertsov called "very good". Chekhov apparently responded to the request and included it into Volume 1 of the Collected Works published by Adolf Marks in 1899–1901.

Background
The story had an autobiographical element to it. Mikhail Chekhov remembered: "This story' hero, Ivan Matveyich, is a true portrait of our brother Ivan, in those days when he, still destitute and before starting to teach, used to cross the whole of Moscow on foot, to Sokolniki, where the writer P. D. Boborykin lived, to copy his texts, the author dictating."

Summary
A 'renowned scientist' ['writer', in the original version] gets more and more exasperated by his young copyist's being chronically late. Each day he promises himself to sack Ivan Matveyich, but becomes more and more endeared to this eccentric, destitute, and highly original person.

References

External links
 Иван Матвеич, the original Russian text
 Ivan Matveyich, English translation

Short stories by Anton Chekhov
1886 short stories
Works originally published in Russian newspapers